Akombo Ukeyima (born November 25, 1987) is a Nigerian footballer, who currently plays for Lobi Stars F.C.

Career 
Before joining Åland based club, Ukeyima played for the Swedish outfit GIF Sundsvall. In January 2009, he left IFK Mariehamn in the Finnish Premier Division after a loan period, and returned to Sundsvall.

Ukeyima made his debut for Mariehamn on August 31, 2008, and scored the opening goal in his new club's 2 – 1 victory over RoPS.

Before moving to Scandinavia he played for Kwara United F.C. until January 2007. The striker left in January 2011 his club GIF Sundsvall and returned to Nigeria, who signed for Sunshine Stars F.C.

References

External links 
Player profile 

1987 births
Living people
Nigerian footballers
Nigerian expatriate footballers
Allsvenskan players
Veikkausliiga players
GIF Sundsvall players
IFK Mariehamn players
Kwara United F.C. players
Sunshine Stars F.C. players
Lobi Stars F.C. players
Expatriate footballers in Sweden
Expatriate footballers in Finland
Association football forwards